The Ski Mountaineering World Cup is an international circuit of ski mountaineering competitions organized annually by the International Ski Mountaineering Federation (ISMF), starting from the 2004 season.

Men

Individual

Vertical race

Team race

Long distance

Sprint race

Overall

Women

Individual

Vertical race

Team race

Long distance

Sprint race

Overall

See also
 World Championships of Ski Mountaineering

References

External links
 

Ski mountaineering competitions
Ski Mo